In enzymology, a 12alpha-hydroxysteroid dehydrogenase is an enzyme that catalyzes the chemical reaction

3alpha,7alpha,12alpha-trihydroxy-5beta-cholanate + NADP+  3alpha,7alpha-dihydroxy-12-oxo-5beta-cholanate + NADPH + H+

Thus, the two substrates of this enzyme are 3alpha,7alpha,12alpha-trihydroxy-5beta-cholanate and NADP+, whereas its 3 products are 3alpha,7alpha-dihydroxy-12-oxo-5beta-cholanate, NADPH, and H+.

This enzyme belongs to the family of oxidoreductases, specifically those acting on the CH-OH group of donor with NAD+ or NADP+ as acceptor. The systematic name of this enzyme class is 12alpha-hydroxysteroid:NADP+ 12-oxidoreductase. Other names in common use include 12alpha-hydroxy steroid dehydrogenase, 12alpha-hydroxy steroid dehydrogenase, NAD+-dependent 12alpha-hydroxysteroid dehydrogenase, and NADP+-12alpha-hydroxysteroid dehydrogenase. This enzyme is involved in a metabolic pathway that degrades bile acids into cholesterol.

References

 
 

EC 1.1.1
NADPH-dependent enzymes
Enzymes of unknown structure